Frank P. Tomasulo is an American film critic, theoretician, and historian. He received a B.A. in philosophy from Brooklyn College, his M.A. in cinema studies at New York University, and his Ph.D. in film and television from UCLA. He served as editor of the Journal of Film and Video from 1991 to 1996 and Cinema Journal from 1997 to 2002.

He has published widely on Hollywood and international cinema, American television, and screen acting. He has been a longtime advocate for the modernist cinema and an outspoken critic of the early movies of American director Steven Spielberg. His anthology on film performance, More than a Method, was co-edited with Diane Carson and Cynthia Baron. (Nominated for the 2005 Theatre Library Association Book Award) Tomasulo's book-length monograph, Michelangelo Antonioni: Ambiguity in the Modernist Cinema, was published in 2019.

Tomasulo has taught a wide variety of film history, theory, production, and screenwriting classes at UCLA, Ithaca College, Cornell University, the University of California–Santa Cruz, Georgia State University, Southern Methodist University, and Florida State University, as well as being an academic administrator. He currently teaches independent film and other cinema courses at The City College of New York, City University of New York and Hunter College;  television history and criticism at Sarah Lawrence College; and cinema history and genre film classes at Pace University. In addition, Tomasulo teaches on-line graduate seminars on Silent Cinema, American Film History, Italian Cinema, and other topics for National University.

In 2009, Tomasulo became the first recipient of the University Film and Video Association  (UFVA) Teaching Award. He has also won a number of other pedagogical awards at Georgia State University, Ithaca College, and elsewhere. His scholarly writing has been recognized with awards from the Society for Cinema and Media Studies (SCMS), the University Film and Video Association, and Ithaca College, among other institutions and organizations.

References

Year of birth missing (living people)
Living people
American film critics
Brooklyn College alumni
Lafayette High School (New York City) alumni
Tisch School of the Arts alumni
UCLA Film School alumni